Mickey K. Walls (born June 1, 1974 in Vancouver, British Columbia) is a retired Thoroughbred horse racing jockey who was a Champion in both the United States and Canada.

Early life
Mickey Walls grew up in Langley, British Columbia, the son of Thoroughbred racehorse trainer, Joe Walls.

Riding career
He began riding professionally in 1990 at age sixteen, first competing at Exhibition Park in Vancouver. Immediately successful, in the fall he went east to Toronto to ride at Woodbine Racetrack and then at Greenwood Raceway where he was the leading jockey at the Autumn Meet. For his performances, Walls was voted the Sovereign Award as the 1990 Canadian Champion Apprentice Jockey.

Still an apprentice in Canada, in 1991 Mickey Walls had a spectacular year, setting a Canadian record for most races won by an apprentice jockey with 231, and winning more races and garnering more purse money at Woodbine Racetrack than any jockey in history. At the Greenwood Raceway Spring Meet he won a second riding title. His 1991 efforts saw him become the first apprentice jockey to be voted the Sovereign Award and the United States' Eclipse Award in the same year. In addition, he was voted the overall Canadian Champion Jockey.

As a result of a serious injury, 1992 proved to be a difficult year for Mickey Walls. Nevertheless, he was the leading jockey at the Greenwood Spring Meet before breaking a leg in a racing accident that kept him out of racing for the season. In 1993, he was again back in form and was the leading jockey at Woodbine Racetrack for a second time. In 1994 and 1995, Walls competed in the United States at various tracks including Arlington Park, Churchill Downs, Fair Grounds Race Course, Keeneland, and Santa Anita Park. He returned to race in Canada in 1996 where he won the final two legs of the Canadian Triple Crown series, capturing the Prince of Wales Stakes aboard Stephanotis then the Breeders' Stakes on Canada's top turf runner and future Hall of Fame inductee, Chief Bearhart. Among his other racing accomplishments, in 1999 Mickey Walls rode Woodcarver to victory in the Queen's Plate, Canada's most prestigious race and the first leg of the Triple Crown series.

Retirement
After years of struggling against weight gain, in 2002 Walls retired but in 2003 attempted a short-lived comeback at Nad Al Sheba Racecourse in Dubai before retiring permanently.

Honors
In 2008, Mickey Walls was inducted in the British Columbia Thoroughbred Hall of Fame and was a nominee for the Canadian Horse Racing Hall of Fame in 2009. In June 2013, he won the Avelino Gomez Memorial Award for significant contributions to the sport of thoroughbred horse racing. Walls was later named into the Canadian Horse Racing Hall of Fame in 2019.

References

 May 1, 1992 Toronto Star article titled "What's next for sensational Walls?"
 Mickey Walls at the NTRA
 November 26, 1991 New York Times article on Mickey Walls

1974 births
Avelino Gomez Memorial Award winners
Canadian jockeys
Sovereign Award winners
Eclipse Award winners
Sportspeople from Vancouver
Living people
People from Langley, British Columbia (city)
Canadian Horse Racing Hall of Fame inductees